Northern Europe comprises Denmark, Estonia, Finland, Iceland, Ireland, Latvia, Lithuania, Norway, Sweden, and the United Kingdom, and the following dependent territories: the Faroe Islands controlled by Denmark, Åland controlled by Finland, Svalbard and Jan Mayen controlled by Norway, and the British Crown Dependencies, Guernsey and Jersey, and the Isle of Man. Out of these, the United Kingdom is not yet party to the Convention for the Safeguarding of the Intangible Cultural Heritage by The United Nations Educational, Scientific and Cultural Organization (UNESCO). The convention was drafted in 2003, and taking effect in 2006.

According to the convention, intangible cultural heritage elements are components of the cultural heritage within a territory that are equally as important as physical cultural elements, like World Heritage Sites. The elements are abstract and must be learned, encompassing traditional knowledge which includes festivals, music, performances, celebrations, handicrafts, and oral traditions. Intangible cultural heritage is based on the opinions of local communities, as according to the convention there needs to be stakeholders viewing the elements as "their heritage". The member states undertake to create one or several inventories of the intangible cultural heritage within their territory. This work is ongoing in Northern Europe.

UNESCO upholds two international lists of intangible cultural heritage, the Representative List of the Intangible Cultural Heritage of Humanity and the List of Intangible Cultural Heritage in Need of Urgent Safeguarding. The member states apply for cultural elements to be added to the international lists. The Intergovernmental Committee for the Safeguarding of Intangible Cultural Heritage, which approves new inscription requests, and a definition of "intangible cultural heritage". As part of the convention, the UNESCO also upholds the Register of Good Safeguarding Practices that contains that reflect the principles of the convention – that is to uphold living traditions. No cultural elements from Northern Europe have been included on the List of Intangible Cultural Heritage in Need of Urgent Safeguarding.

Inventories of intangible cultural heritage in Northern Europe

Cultural elements from Northern Europe on the Representative List
Six intangible cultural heritage elements on UNESCO's representative list originate from the region. Three have been inscribed as elements of Estonia and Lithuania, two as elements of Ireland and Latvia, one for Norway and Finland, and none for Denmark, Iceland, Sweden, and the United Kingdom. Estonia, Lithuania, and Latvia share one cultural heritage element. 

The table lists information about each International Cultural Heritage element:

Name: official name, worded as inscribed on the list
Region: region within or outside a country where a heritage is still practiced
Country: country, as inscribed on the list
Year: the year the site was inscribed on the Intangible Cultural Heritage List
Session: the session and decision in which a heritage is inscribed by the committee
Description: brief description of the heritage
Site: official UNESCO page

Total heritage elements by country
Exclusive heritage elements are those that are inscribed as a heritage of a single country. Shared heritage elements are inscribed as elements of multiple countries.

Entries from Northern Europe in the Register of Good Practices 
The first entry from Northern Europe in the Register of Good Practices was accepted in 2016. Oselvar boat – reframing a traditional learning process of building and use to a modern context is a concept from Norway. A non-profit boatyard and workshop foundation supports the traditional knowledge concerning Oselvar boats.

In 2018, The Land-of-Legends programme in Kronoberg Region (South-Sweden) was added to the registry for promoting and revitalizing the art of storytelling. The organization behind the Land-of Legends programme is the Storytelling Network of Kronoberg, an accredited NGO within the system of the Convention for the Safeguarding of the Intangible Cultural Heritage. 

Norway is also part of a multi national entry in the Register of Good Practices, inscribed in 2020. The entry, named Craft techniques and customary practices of cathedral workshops, or Bauhütten, in Europe, know-how, transmission, development of knowledge and innovation, is a joint listing for Norway, Germany, Austria, France, Switzerland.

Notes

References

External links
UNESCO Intangible Cultural Heritage: Official site
UNESCO Convention for the Safeguarding of Intangible Cultural Heritage: Text of the convention

 Northern Europe
Northern Europe
Northern Europe
Europe-related lists